Barasat Sadar subdivision is an administrative subdivision of the North 24 Parganas district in the Indian state of West Bengal. After transferring Rajarhat-Gopalpur Municipality and Rajarhat (Community development block) to Bidhannagar subdivision, Barasat Sadar subdivision's total area becomes 894.61 sq km (345.41 sq mi), population becomes 2,196,874 (2011 Census) and density becomes 2,500/sq km (6,400/sq mi).

History
In 1757, the East India Company obtained the zamindari or land-holders rights of the 24 Parganas Zamindari from Mir Jafar, the new Nawab of Bengal.  Full proprietary status was handed over to Robert Clive in 1759 by a sanad or deed granting him the 24 Parganas as a jagir. After Clive's death in 1774, full proprietary rights of the 24 Parganas zamindari reverted to the East India Company. In 1814, the district consisted of two parts – the suburbs of Kolkata (referred to as Dihi Panchannagram) and the rest. In 1834, several parganas of Jessore and Nadia were added to the 24 Parganas. The district was divided into two divisions. The Alipore division comprised territories originally ceded to the company and the Barasat division comprised territories added from Jessore and Nadia. The two divisions were replaced by eight subdivisions in 1861 – Diamond Harbour, Baruipur, Alipore, Dum Dum, Barrackpore, Barasat, Basirhat and Satkhira. The Satkhira subdivision was transferred to the newly formed Khulna district in 1882, the Baruipur subdivision was abolished in 1883 and the Dum Dum and Barrackpore subdivisions were abolished in 1893. Barrackpore subdivision was reconstituted in 1904 with portions of Barasat and Alipore subdivisions. In 2015, Rajarhat-Gopalpur Municipality and Mahisbathan II gram panchayat were merged with the new-formed Bidhannagar Municipal Corporation. Subsequently Rajarhat-Gopalpur Municipality and Rajarhat (Community development block) were transferred to Bidhannagar subdivision and thus the area of Barasat Sadar subdivision is reduced.

Geography

Some areas of Barasat Sadar subdivision are part of the North Hooghly Flat and other areas are part of the North Bidyadhari Plain, two of the three physiographic regions in the district located in the lower Ganges Delta. The country is flat. It is a little raised above flood level and the highest ground borders the river channels. The sturdy peasants raise crops of rice, jute and sugarcane from the alluvial soil. There are clumps of palm and fruit trees in which village homesteads nestle.

Subdivisions
North 24 Parganas district is divided into the following administrative subdivisions:

Religion
Given below is an overview of the religion-wise break-up of the population across the subdivisions of North 24 Parganas district, as per 2011 census:

North 24 Parganas district with 24.22% Muslims (in 2001) has been identified as a minority concentrated district by the Ministry of Minority Affairs, Government of India. A baseline survey on religious minority population has been carried out under the aegis of Indian Council of Social Science Research and funded by the Ministry of Minority Affairs. For information on the survey see North 24 Parganas: minority concentrated district.

Population movement
North 24 Parganas district is densely populated, mainly because of the influx of refugees from East Pakistan (later Bangladesh). With a density of population of 2,182 per km2 in 1971, it was 3rd in terms of density per km2 in West Bengal after Kolkata and Howrah, and 20th in India. According to the District Human Development Report: North 24 Parganas, "High density is also explained partly by the rapid growth of urbanization in the district. In 1991, the percentage of urban population in the district has been 51.23."

As per the Refugee Relief and Rehabilitation Department of the Government of West Bengal, the census figures show the number of refugees from East Pakistan in 1971 was nearly 6 million (60 lakhs) and in 1981, the number was assessed at 8 million (80 lakhs). A district-wise break-up in 1971, shows the main thrust of the refugee influx was on 24-Parganas (22.3% of the total refugees), Nadia (20.3%), Bankura (19.1%) and Kolkata (12.9%).

The North 24 Paraganas district has a 352 km long international border with Bangladesh, out of which 160 km is land border and 192 km is riverine border. Only a small portion of the border has been fenced and it is popularly referred to as a porous border. There are reports of Bangladeshi infiltrators. The CD Block pages carry Decadal Population Growth information.

An estimate made in 2000 places the total number of illegal Bangladeshi immigrants in India at 1.5 crore, with around 3 lakh entering every year. The thumb rule for such illegal immigrants is that for each illegal person caught four get through. While many immigrants have settled in the border areas, some have moved on, even to far way places such as Mumbai and Delhi. The border is guarded by the Border Security Force. During the UPA government, Sriprakash Jaiswal, Union Minister of State for Home Affairs, had made a statement in Parliament on 14 July 2004, that there were 12 million illegal Bangladeshi infiltrators living in India, and West Bengal topped the list with 5.7 million Bangladeshis. More recently, Kiren Rijiju, Minister of State for Home Affairs in the NDA government has put the figure at around 20 million.

Administrative units
Barasat Sadar subdivision has 13 police stations (now 9), 7 community development blocks (now 6), 7 panchayat samitis (now 6), 58 gram panchayats (now 52), 523 mouzas, 493 inhabited villages, 6 municipalities (now 5) and 34 census towns (now 25).

The municipalities are at Barasat, Habra, Gobardanga, Ashoknagar Kalyangarh, Madhyamgram and Rajarhat-Gopalpur (made part of Bidhannagar Municipal Corporation in 2015 and also transferred to Bidhannagar subdivision).

The census towns are: Nokpul, Maslandapur, Sadpur, Betpuli, Anarbaria, Purba Narayanpur, Guma, Bara Bamonia, Khordabamonia, Bira, Dhania, Kokapur, Shibalaya, Gangapur, Chandrapur, Nebadhai Duttapukur, Chatta Baria, Joypul, Digha, Kulberia, Bamangachhi, Chak Barbaria, Koyra, Deara, Deulia, Raigachhi1, Rekjuani1, Bhatenda1, Basina1, Bishnupur1, Chandpur Champagachhi1, Jatragachhi1, Ghuni1 and Sulangari1. The subdivision has its headquarters at Barasat.

 Note 1: In 2015, these 9 census towns were transferred to Bidhannagar subdivision.

Kolkata Urban Agglomeration
The following Municipalities and Census Town in Barasat Sadar subdivision were part of Kolkata Urban Agglomeration in the 2011 census: Barasat (M), Madhyamgram (M), Rajarhat-Gopalpur (M) (made part of Bidhannagar Municipal Corporation in 2015 and also transferred to Bidhannagar subdivision) and Raigachhi (CT) (transferred to Bidhannagar subdivision in 2015).

Police stations
Police stations in Barasat Sadar subdivision have the following features and jurisdiction:

 Note 1: In 2012 these four police stations were placed under Bidhannagar Police Commissionerate and in 2015, they were also transferred to Bidhannagar subdivision.

Blocks
Community development blocks in Barasat Sadar subdivision are:

 Note 1: In 2015, Rajarhat (community development block) was transferred to Bidhannagar subdivision.

Gram panchayats
The subdivision contains 58 (now 52) gram panchayats under 7 (now 6) community development blocks:

 Gram panchayats in Barasat I CD Block are: Chhoto Jagulia, Ichhapur–Nilganj, Kotra, Purba Khilkapur, Dattapukur–I, Kadambagachhi, Paschim Khilkapur, Dattapukur–II and Kashimpur.
 Gram panchayats in Barasat II CD Block are: Chandigarh–Rohanda, Falti Beliaghata, Kemia Khamarpara, Kirtipur–I, Dadpur, Kiritipur–II and Shason.
 Gram panchayats in Amdanga CD Block are: Adhata, Bodai, Maricha, Amdanga, Chandigarh, Sadhanpur, Beraberia and Taraberia.
 Gram panchayats in Deganga CD Block are: Amulia, Champatala, Hadipur Jhikra–I, Sohai–Shwetpur, Berachampa–I, Chaurashi, Hadipur Jhikra–II, Berachampa–II, Deganga–I, Kolsur, Chakla, Deganga–II and Nurnagar.
 Gram panchayats in Habra I CD Block are: Bargum–I, Kumra, Machhlandapur–II, Rautara, Bargum–II, Machhlandapur–I and Prithiba.
 Gram panchayats in Habra II CD Block are: Banspole, Bhurkunda, Guma–I, Rajibpur Bira, Beraberi, Dighara Malikberia, Guma–II and Srikrishnapur.
 Gram panchayats in Rajarhat CD Block1 are: Chandpur, Mahisbathan–II, Rajarhat Bishnupur–I, Jangrahatiara–II, Patharghata and Rajarhat Bishnupur–II.
 Note 1: In 2015, this CD Block was completely transferred to Bidhannagar subdivision.

Municipal towns/ cities
An overview of the municipal towns and cities in Barasat Sadar subdivision is given below.

Note 1: Bidhannagar Municipal Corporation was formed in 2015 and Rajarhat-Gopalpur Municipality has been part of it and also transferred to Bidhannagar subdivision.

Education
North 24 Parganas district had a literacy rate of 84.06% (for population of 7 years and above) as per the census of India 2011. Bangaon subdivision had a literacy rate of 80.57%, Barasat Sadar subdivision 84.90%, Barrackpur subdivision 89.09%, Bidhannagar subdivision 89.16% and Basirhat subdivision 75.67%.

Given in the table below (data in numbers) is a comprehensive picture of the education scenario in North 24 Parganas district for the year 2012-13:

Note: Primary schools include junior basic schools; middle schools, high schools and higher secondary schools include madrasahs; technical schools include junior technical schools, junior government polytechnics, industrial technical institutes, industrial training centres, nursing training institutes etc.; technical and professional colleges include engineering colleges, medical colleges, para-medical institutes, management colleges, teachers training and nursing training colleges, law colleges, art colleges, music colleges etc. Special and non-formal education centres include sishu siksha kendras, madhyamik siksha kendras, centres of Rabindra mukta vidyalaya, recognised Sanskrit tols, institutions for the blind and other handicapped persons, Anganwadi centres, reformatory schools etc.

The following institutes are located in Barasat Sadar subdivision:

West Bengal State University was established at Berunanpukuria in 2008. In 2018, WBSU has made it to the comprehensive list of the best public universities in Bengal. The rating was by Careers 369, the country's largest education and career counselling portal.
Barasat Government College was established at Barasat in 1950.
Barasat College was established at Barasat in 1972.
Sarada Ma Girl's College was established at Nabapally, Barasat in 2006.
Gobardanga Hindu College was established at Gobardanga in 1947.
Kingston College of Science was established at Berunanpukuria in 2004.
Vivekananda College was established at Madhyamgram in 1986.
Sree Chaitanya College was established at Habra in 1956.
Sree Chaitanya Mahavidyalaya (formerly Sree Chaitanya College of Commerce) was established at Habra in 1965.
Netaji Satabarshiki Mahavidyalaya was established at Ashoknagar in 2000.
Banipur Mahila Mahavidyalaya was established at Banipur, Habra, in 1999.
Chandraketugarh Sahidullah Smriti Mahavidyalaya was established at Berachampa in 1997.
Amdanga Jugal Kishore Mahavidyalaya was established at Sadhanpur in 2007.
 Techno India, Banipur is a private engineering college.
Savita Devi Education Trust – Brainware Group of Institutions, established at Barasat in 2010, offers courses in engineering and management.
Camellia School of Engineering & Technology was established at Barasat in 2006.
Derozio Memorial College1 was established at Rajarhat in 1996.
Dr. A.P.J. Abdul Kalam Government College1 was established at New Town, Kolkata in 2013.
St. Xavier's University, Kolkata1, a private Jesuit university, was established at New Town, Kolkata in January 2017.
University of Engineering & Management (UEM), Kolkata1, a private university, was established at New Town, Kolkata in 2015.
Amity University, Kolkata1, a private university, was established at New Town, Kolkata in 2015.
Aliah University1 was initially founded as Mohammedan College in 1880 and was elevated as a university in 2008. The main campus of the university is located at New Town, Kolkata.
B. P. Poddar Institute of Management & Technology1 was established near Netaji Subhas Chandra Bose International Airport in 1999.
Note 1: Bidhannagar Municipal Corporation was formed in 2015 and Rajarhat-Gopalpur Municipality has been part of it and also transferred to Bidhannagar subdivision. Hence all the educational institutions in Rajarhat-Gopalpur Municipality are now in Bidhannagar subdivision, not in Barasat Sadar Subdivision.

Healthcare
The table below (all data in numbers) presents an overview of the medical facilities available and patients treated in the hospitals, health centres and sub-centres in 2013 in North 24 Parganas district.

.* Excluding nursing homes. **Subdivision-wise break up for certain items not available.

Medical facilities available in Barasat Sadar subdivision are as follows:

Hospitals: (Name, location, beds)
District Hospital, Barasat, 500 beds
District Jail Hospital, Barasat, 15 beds
Ashoknagar State General Hospital, Ashoknagar, 50 beds
Habra State General Hospital, Habra, 131 beds
NSC Bose Specialised Hospital, Madhyamgram, 60 beds
Vidyasagar Matri Sadan, Rajarhat, 20 beds1
Jyangra CH Care Hospital, Baguiati1

Rural Hospitals: (Name, block, location, beds)
Madhyamgram Rural Hospital, Madhyamgram, 30 beds
Maslandapur Rural Hospital, Maslandapur, 30 beds
Sabdalpur Rural Hospital, Sabdalpur, 30 beds
Amdanga Rural Hospital, Amdanga, 30 beds
Biswanathpur Rural Hospital, Deganga, 30 beds
Rekjoani Rural Hospital, Rajarhat, 30 beds

Block Primary Health Centres: (Name, block, location, beds)
Chhota Jagulia BPHC, Chhota Jagulia, 15 beds

Primary Health Centres: (CD Block-wise)(CD Block, PHC location, beds)
Habra I CD Block: Rautara PHC (10)
Habra II CD Block: Pukurkona PHC, Bira Ballabhpur (10), Pumlia PHC, Sendanga (6)
Barasat I CD Block: Kadambagachi PHC (10), Duttapukur PHC (6)
Barasat II CD Block: Mitpukuria PHC, Shasan (10), Bagband Siberia (Kemia Kamarpara) PHC, Kirtipur (6)
Amdanga CD Block: Adhata-Joypur PHC, Adhata (6), Marich PHC, Masunda (10), Baraberia PHC (6)
Deganga CD Block: Hadipur-Jhikra PHC, Ajinagar (6), Raypur Chakla PHC, Chakla (10), Kolsur PHC, Deganga (10), Kartickpur (6)
Rajarhat CD Block: Chandpur PHC (Arbelia), Badu (10), Patharghata PHC(10)

Private Medical Facilities (Name, location, speciality)

Narayana Multispeciality Hospital, 78, Jessore Road (South), Barasat (arthroscopy, gastroenterology, joint replacement surgery, nephrology, ophthalmology, urology etc.) 
Suraksha The Barasat Clinic, 83/10 Jessore Road (South), Anima Apartment, Dak Bungalow Morh (cardiology,  diabetology, neurology, oncology, orthopaedics, diabetology etc.)
Care & Cure Hospital, Nabapally, SN Road, Barasat (cardiology, orthopaedic, gynecology etc.)
Tata Medical Centre, New Town, 14 Mar (E-W), Rajarhat (oncology etc.)1
Sight N Smile Multispeciality Eye & Dental Care Centre, Suraj Apartment, 1st Floor, Rajarhat, Mahisgot, HDFC Bank Building, Opp DLF 1, Newtown (ophthalmology, dentistry, cardiology, orthopaedics etc.)1
Teeth Care Multispeciality Dental Clinic, B1, New Town Metro Plaza, Aatghara-Rajarhat Road, Ataghara Petrol Pump-Chinar Park Morh, Rajarhat1
Health ETC., Hatiara Road, Rajarhat, Jyangra (cardiology, general medicine etc.)1
Sparsha Infertility Centre, Station Road, Purbalaya, South Bankimpally, Madhyamgram ((IVF, IUI, ICSI, Gynaecology, Laparoscopy, Hysteroscopy etc.)1
Spectra Eye Hospital, 108, Jessore Rd, Chowmatha, Vivekananda Nagar, Madhyamgram, (Low Vision, Prosthetic Eyes Vision Therapy, Cataract, Cornea, Paediatric Ophthalmology, Advanced Retina, Glaucoma etc.)1
Note 1: Bidhannagar Municipal Corporation was formed in 2015 and Rajarhat-Gopalpur Municipality has been part of it and also transferred to Bidhannagar subdivision. Hence all the hospitals in Rajarhat-Gopalpur Municipality are now in Bidhannagar subdivision, not in Barasat Sadar Subdivision.

Electoral constituencies
Lok Sabha (parliamentary) and Vidhan Sabha (state assembly) constituencies in Barasat subdivision were as follows:

 Note 1: In 2015, these Vidhan Sabha Constituencies were transferred to Bidhannagar subdivision.

References

Subdivisions in North 24 Parganas district
Barasat